The Swiss Sports Personality of the Year was originally chosen annually from 1950 by the Swiss newspaper Sport. As the newspaper was discontinued in the 1990s, the winners are now chosen by Swiss journalists and TV viewers. Both groups' votes are equally weighted in determining the final result. In 2009 Roger Federer had a large lead among voters working in the media, but viewers voted for Didier Cuche, giving him the award. Even Cuche was surprised and in his speech he apologized to Federer, saying "I hope he's not too angry."  In 2005 spectators voted for Thomas Lüthi while the media instead voted for Federer.

Roger Federer has won this award a record seven times (2003, 2004, 2006, 2007, 2012, 2014, and 2017).

List of winners

References

1950 establishments in Switzerland
Awards established in 1950
National sportsperson-of-the-year trophies and awards
Sport in Switzerland
Swiss awards